Samantha Karen Fox (born 15 April 1966) is an English pop singer and former glamour model from Mile End in the East End of London. She rose to fame as a topless Page 3 model in The Sun tabloid newspaper, where she appeared regularly from 1983 until 1986. Her images also featured in numerous other publications. She became one of the most photographed British women of the 1980s and one of the era's most prominent sex symbols. 

Fox signed a five-album record deal with Jive Records in 1986. Released in March of that year, her debut single for the label, "Touch Me (I Want Your Body)", became a top-10 hit across Europe, North America, and Australia, reaching number one in several countries. Fox released her debut studio album Touch Me in July 1986, and followed it with the albums Samantha Fox in 1987 and I Wanna Have Some Fun in 1988, each of which produced international hit singles. Fox received a Best British Female Artist nomination at the Brit Awards 1988. Her subsequent studio albums Just One Night (1991), 21st Century Fox (1997), and Angel with an Attitude (2005) were less commercially successful, but she has continued to tour and has indicated that she will release a seventh studio album in 2023, produced by Ian Masterson.

Fox has appeared in a number of films and reality television shows, and has occasionally worked as a television presenter. Following persistent rumours about her sexual orientation, she publicly acknowledged in 2003 that she was in a same-sex relationship with her then-manager Myra Stratton. Their relationship lasted for 16 years until Stratton died of cancer in 2015. Fox subsequently began a relationship with her tour manager Linda Birgitte Olsen. The couple became engaged in 2020 and married in 2022.

Early life
Fox was born on 15 April 1966 in Mile End, East London, the oldest daughter of actress Carole Ann Wilken and John Patrick Fox. She had a sister (died 2023), Vanessa, and two half-siblings from her father's second marriage, Frederica and Frankie. Fox comes from a family of market traders.

Fox took an interest in the theatre from an early age; she first appeared on a theatre stage when she was three years old. She formed her first pop band with Richard Smart, Edward Gallagher and Bob Day when she was fourteen. She attended St Thomas More Catholic School, Wood Green; and was enrolled in the Anna Scher Theatre School from the age of fifteen. The next year she signed her first record deal, with Lamborghini Records.

Career

Modelling

At the start of 1983, Fox's mother submitted several photographs that she had taken of her daughter in lingerie to The Sunday People newspaper's Girl of the Year amateur modelling contest. She came in second place out of 20,000 entrants and the photographs drew her to the attention of the newspaper The Sun, which invited her to pose for Page 3.

Her parents gave their consent for her to pose topless, and her first Page 3 photograph appeared in the Sun on 22 February 1983. She signed a four-year Page 3 modelling contract with the Sun, and won its "Page 3 Girl of the Year" award for three consecutive years: 1984 to 1986. She is recognised today as the most popular pin-up girl of her era, as well as one of the most-photographed British women of the 1980s.

In 1995, aged 29, she made a one-off appearance in The Sun to promote Page 3's 25th anniversary. After receiving an overwhelmingly positive reader response, she appeared in the slot every day of that week, with Friday's final topless picture given away as an A3-sized poster. The following year, she appeared in the October issue of Playboy magazine.

Singing

In tandem with her modelling career, Fox attempted to launch a singing career in 1983. Her first single, credited to S.F.X. was called "Rockin' with My Radio", released on the Lamborghini Records label. It was produced by Ian Gillan Band and Spencer Davis Group member Ray Fenwick, who also wrote the b-side. The collaboration with Fenwick continued into 1984 and her second single, "Aim to Win", (under her full name) was released. Neither of these singles made the chart and her singing was put on hold for the time being.

Two years later Fox was invited to attend an open audition for Jive Records, as the label was seeking "a British Madonna" to sing the song "Touch Me (I Want Your Body)". She was successful and was offered a five album deal. The single was released in March 1986 and became an instant hit, reaching the top 10 all across Europe and topped the charts in a number of countries. In the UK the song reached No.3. Some months later, Fox was launched onto the American market and the single also peaked within the top 10 at No.4.

Chart success continued with her second single, "Do Ya Do Ya (Wanna Please Me)", which also hit the UK top 10 and was followed by her debut album, Touch Me, which peaked at No.17 in the UK as well as charting all over Europe, including a No.1 placing in Finland.

In 1987, having now finished her modelling career, Fox forged ahead with her singing and performed live across the globe, including the US, where her career continued to flourish. A second album, simply titled Samantha Fox, contained the hits "Nothing's Gonna Stop Me Now" (UK #8) and "Naughty Girls (Need Love Too)" (US #3). The former of these produced by top production team Stock, Aitken and Waterman, while the latter was remixed by US production duo Full Force. These collaborations continued into her third album where both contributed songs and further hits. 1988's I Wanna Have Some Fun featured the hits "I Only Wanna Be With You" (UK #16) and "I Wanna Have Some Fun" (US #8). The album also charted in both territories.  By the end of the decade, Fox had scored three top 10 hits in both the UK and US and three gold albums in the latter. Australian and European success was also notable.

The 1990s however saw a sharp decline in sales as none of her remaining albums produced any hits. Three further studio albums were released, namely: Just One Night (1991), 21st Century Fox (1997) and Angel With an Attitude (2005). A Greatest Hits album was issued in 2009, both in single CD and double CD formats. In 2012 her first 4 albums were re-issued as double deluxe CDs by Cherry Red.

Fox did enjoy a few hit collaborations in the years since however, appearing with the band Sox in the heats for the 1995 Eurovision Song Contest and scored a minor hit with their song "Go for the Heart", a UK chart hit with "Santa Maria", by DJ Milano and a European hit with Swedish singer Gunther in 2004.

Film and television
In the late 1980s, Fox appeared in television advertisements for a Leicestershire-based car dealership network with the slogan "Follow the Fox to Swithland Motors". Around the same time, she also appeared in television advertisements for bingo in The Sun newspaper.

In 1990, she appeared on the American sitcom Charles in Charge as Samantha Steele, a fictional rock star whose agent pushes her into a romance with Charles (Scott Baio) so the paparazzi will print it in the tabloids. Her film career included roles in The Match (1999), written and directed by Mick Davis and starring Richard E. Grant, Ian Holm and Tom Sizemore, 7 Cases (2015) starring Steven Berkoff, and the comedy horror film Sharknado 5: Global Swarming (2017). In 1995 she guest starred in the Hindi film Rock Dancer.

In 2008, Fox and her partner Myra Stratton took part in Celebrity Wife Swap, exchanging with Freddie Starr and his wife Donna. In November 2009, she took part in ITV's I'm a Celebrity...Get Me Out of Here!; she was voted out on day 16. In 2010, she appeared in a celebrity episode of Come Dine with Me with Calum Best, Janice Dickinson, and Jeff Brazier. In 2016, Fox became a participant in Celebrity Big Brother 18 and she just missed out on reaching the final finishing in seventh place.

Personal life
Fox's father Patrick, a former carpenter, managed her career until 1991, when she hired accountants to trace over £1 million (£ million today) that she believed he had embezzled from her accounts. She sued her father, who by then had divorced and remarried, and in May 1995, she was awarded a £363,000 (£ million today) court settlement. Patrick Fox died in 2000, at that time they had not spoken to each other for nearly a decade.

In the late 1980s, Fox became romantically linked with Australian career criminal Peter Foster. They began dating but she turned down his marriage proposal. She also had a relationship with Paul Stanley, the rhythm guitarist and co-lead vocalist of rock band Kiss. Rumours regarding Fox's sexual orientation began to surface in 1999 when she judged a lesbian beauty pageant, and rumours circulated that the woman with whom she resided, Cris Bonacci, the Australian former lead guitarist for the rock band Girlschool, was her lover. The relationship was confirmed later by Bonacci in an interview.

In 2003, Fox made a statement about her personal life: "I have slept with other women but I've not been in love before Myra Stratton. People say I'm gay. All I know is that I'm in love with Myra [Stratton, my manager]. I love her completely and want to spend the rest of my life with her." Fox said that she had been reluctant to come out because, having already dealt with obsessed fans and stalkers, she feared fans' possible reactions. In 2009, she announced her plans to form a civil partnership with Stratton. In 2015, at 60 years old, Stratton died of cancer, at which point she and Fox had been in a relationship for 16 years. After that Fox began a relationship with her tour manager Linda Birgitte Olsen, a native of Norway. Olsen proposed and the couple became engaged on Valentine's Day in 2020.  They married on 18 June 2022.

Charitable activity
In 2008, Fox donated her favourite bra to a charity auction.

In 2011, she appeared as part of a campaign for LGBT charity the Albert Kennedy Trust.

Discography

Studio albums
 Touch Me (1986)
 Samantha Fox (1987)
 I Wanna Have Some Fun (1988)
 Just One Night (1991)
 21st Century Fox (1997)
 Angel with an Attitude (2005)

Awards and recognition

Recording Industry Association of America (RIAA)

Source:

References

External links

 
 Official Website  and CIS
 
 
 

1966 births
Living people
English women pop singers
English dance musicians
English house musicians
English female models
Page 3 girls
Glamour models
LGBT models
English LGBT musicians
British LGBT singers
People from Mile End
Alumni of the Anna Scher Theatre School
Singers from London
English Protestants
Converts to Protestantism
LGBT Protestants
English female adult models
20th-century English women singers
20th-century English singers
21st-century English women singers
21st-century English singers
I'm a Celebrity...Get Me Out of Here! (British TV series) participants
Jive Records artists
Sony Music UK artists
English lesbian actresses